Roger Madec (born 27 October 1950) is a member of the Senate of France, representing the city of Paris.  He is a member of the Socialist Party.

References
Page on the Senate website

1950 births
Living people
French Senators of the Fifth Republic
Socialist Party (France) politicians
Politicians from Paris
Senators of Paris